Virgibacillus ndiopensis is a halophilic bacterium from the genus of Virgibacillus.

References

Bacillaceae
Bacteria described in 2017